Moon Motor Car Company (1905 – 1930) was an American automobile company that was located in St. Louis, Missouri. The company had a venerable reputation among the buying public, as it was known for fully assembled, easily affordable mid-level cars using high-quality parts. Often this meant the manufacturing process required more human intervention, leading to operating losses.  The company was founded by carriage maker Joseph W. Moon.  Moon produced both cars and trucks.

History
The first Moon, Model A was shown at the New York Automobile Show in January 1906.  It was a four-cylinder Rutenber engined car. In 1906 former Peerless engineer Louis P. Mooers joined Moon.  Mooers designed a 4-cylinder overhead camshaft engine and with a four-speed transmission and aluminum bodywork, the Moon was a luxury car at $3,000.  In 1908 Moons were sold in the eastern United States using the Hol-Tan name.

By 1910 more mid-priced cars in the $1,500 to $2,000 range that were competitive with Buick and Oldsmobile, became more common. In 1916 Moon was using six-cylinder engines exclusively and in 1919 introduced their Parthenon style radiator. Joseph Moon died in 1919 and was succeeded by his son-in-law and Vice President Stewart McDonald. Moon automobiles could get custom coachwork from designers such as Pullman, Rubay and Murray. Moon exports increased in the 1920s when they reported they were delivering to 47 different countries.

Beginning in 1924, Moon was increasingly unable to meet dealership orders. Factory capacity would be an issue for the next several years. Moon Motor's peak production year was 1925 when the company produced 10,271 vehicles and the prices ranged from $1,195 to $2,540.  Moon produced the Diana via its subsidiary the Diana Motors Company in 1925–1928. Diana motor repair claims and the need to refund government payments from World War I caused a near million dollar loss in 1926. Howard "Dutch" Darrin designed a new car for Moon which would be come the Moon Aerotype. In 1928 Moon introduced its first eight-cylinder car. 

Another subsidiary produced the Windsor in 1929-1930, the last branded Moon became a Windsor in April 1929.  Effects of the Great Depression hampered the company. The company decided to build the Ruxton automobile but boardroom troubles resulted in Windsor and Ruxton both ending production in 1930.  The Moon Motor Car Company ceased trading in 1930, but resolving the finances of the moribund company would take more than two decades.

Models

Gallery

See also 
 Moon automobiles are on display at the National Museum of Transportation in St. Louis, Missouri and the Pioneer Village Foundation Museum in Minden, Nebraska.
 The firm also produced a cotton picker built under contract from the American Cottonpicker Corporation. 
 Walt Disney famously had to sell his 1924 Moon Series A Roadster to help finance the production of Steamboat Willie in 1928.
 Moon Automobile Club
 Moon Automobiles at ConceptCarz

References

Defunct motor vehicle manufacturers of the United States
Manufacturing companies based in St. Louis
Luxury motor vehicle manufacturers
Vehicle manufacturing companies established in 1905
1905 establishments in Missouri
1900s cars
1910s cars
1920s cars
Brass Era vehicles
Vintage vehicles
Motor vehicle manufacturers based in Missouri
Vehicle manufacturing companies disestablished in 1930
Cars introduced in 1905